Nothing but the blues may refer to:

 Nothing but the Blues: The Music and the Musicians (New York : Abbeville Press, 1993), a book edited by Lawrence Cohn
 Nothing but the Blues, an album by Herb Ellis, 1957
 Nothin' but the Blues (Johnny Winter album), 1977
 Nothin' but the Blues (Joe Williams album), 1984
 Nothin' but the Blues (Elkie Brooks album), 1994
 "I Ain't Got Nothin' But the Blues", a 1937 song composed by Duke Ellington, with lyrics written by Don George
 It Ain't Nothin' But the Blues, a musical revue written by Charles Bevel, Lita Gaithers, Randal Myler, Ron Taylor, and Dan Wheetman
 "I Can't Hear Nothing but the Blues", a 1974 song (see Albert King discography)
 Nothing but the Blues (film), a 1995 documentary film about Eric Clapton's career and love for blues music